Pepperwood (formerly Barkdull) is an unincorporated community in Humboldt County, California. It is located 3.5 miles (5.6 km) northwest of Redcrest, at an elevation of 115 feet (35 m). Pepperwood is the northernmost community along the Avenue of the Giants. The ZIP Code is 95569. The community is inside area code 707.

A post office operated at Pepperwood from 1887 to 1892 and from 1901 to 1965. The town was largely destroyed by the Christmas flood of 1964.

Politics

See also

References

Unincorporated communities in Humboldt County, California
Unincorporated communities in California